Ali bey Huseyn oğlu Huseynzade (Salyan, February 24, 1864 – Istanbul, March 17, 1940) was an Azerbaijani writer, thinker, philosopher, artist, doctor, and the creator of the modern Flag of Azerbaijan.

Early years
Ali bey Huseynzade was born in 1864 to a family of Muslim religious clerics in Salyan, in the present-day Azerbaijan. His grandfather Mahammadali Huseinzadeh was the Sheikh ul-Islam (Supreme religious leader) of the Caucasus for 32 years. Ali bey received his primary education at the Tiflis Muslim school followed by the Tiflis Classical Gymnasium. In 1885, he entered the Physics and Math Department at Saint Petersburg University. Upon graduation from there in 1889, Huseynzade moved to Istanbul, where he entered the Medical faculty of Istanbul University (IU). After graduation from IU, he served as a military doctor in the Ottoman Army, and subsequently as an assistant professor at IU. Huseynzade was one of the founders of the Committee of Union and Progress. Ziya Gökalp, was influenced by his Pan-Turkist ideology, and referred to Huseynzade as one of his most important teachers.

Public activity
In 1903, Ali bey returned home and spent the next seven years in Baku. During this period of time, he engaged in scholarly and publishing activities, edited the "Heyat" newspaper, and served as a chief editor of the "Kaspiy" newspaper. In 1905, he joined Alimardan Topchubashev, Reşit Ibragimov, Ferruh Bey Vezirov and Ahmet Ağaoğlu as a part of the Azerbaijani delegation to an all-Russian convention of Muslims, where an agreement was reached on establishing of the Ittifaq al Muslimin a single Muslim party in Russian Empire. In 1906, Huseynzade started publishing the magazine  ("Fusion"), financed by the famous philanthropist Haji Zeynalabdin Taghiyev, and harshly criticized the Tsarist government in his writings.

In 1910, Huseynzade moved to the Ottoman Empire. And in 1911 he was elected a presiding member of the Committee of Union and Progress. From 1915 to 1916 he travelled to several European capitals to reach out for support for the Pan-Turkish movement. In 1918, he returned to Azerbaijan to participate in the formation of Azerbaijan Democratic Republic (ADR), and participated in negotiations for the Ottoman support of the ADR against the Baku Commune. After the fall of ADR in April 1920, Huseynzade permanently settled in Turkey and became a citizen, receiving the surname Turan.

Memory
One of the streets in the Yasamal district of Baku is named after Ali bey Huseynzade and there's a statue of him in the center of his hometown.

References

1864 births
1940 deaths
Azerbaijani artists
Azerbaijani philosophers
Azerbaijani physicians
Azerbaijani professors
Azerbaijani journalists
Azerbaijani magazine editors
Azerbaijani nobility
People from Salyan, Azerbaijan
Turkish people of Azerbaijani descent
Flag designers
Pan-Turkists
Azerbaijani emigrants to Turkey
19th-century Azerbaijani philosophers
20th-century Azerbaijani philosophers